A Woman in White (French: Le Journal d'une femme en blanc) is a 1965 French-Italian drama film directed by Claude Autant-Lara and starring Marie-José Nat, Jean Valmont and Claude Gensac. It was written by Jean Aurenche and André Soubiran.

The film's sets were designed by the art director Max Douy.

Cast
 Marie-José Nat as Claude Sauvage
 Claude Gensac as Mlle Viralleau
 Jean Valmont as Pascal
 Paloma Matta as Mariette Hugon
 Jean-Pierre Dorat as Landeau
 Ellen Bernsen as'Mme Michelon
 Robert Benoît as Yves Hugon
 Martine de Breteuil as La mère de Mariette
 Germaine Delbat as Un docteur
 Daniel Ceccaldi as 'L'inspecteur Georget

References

External links
 

1965 films
1965 drama films
French drama films
Italian drama films
1960s French-language films
Films directed by Claude Autant-Lara
Films about abortion
Films with screenplays by Jean Aurenche
Gaumont Film Company films
1960s Italian films
1960s French films